The Congregation Shearith Israel (Hebrew: קהילת שארית ישראל Kehilat She'arit Yisra'el "Congregation Remnant of Israel") – often called The Spanish and Portuguese Synagogue – is the oldest Jewish congregation in the United States. It was established in 1654 in New Amsterdam by Jews who arrived from Dutch Brazil. Until 1825, when Jewish immigrants from Germany established a congregation, it was the only Jewish congregation in New York City.

The Orthodox synagogue, which follows the Sephardic liturgy, is located on Central Park West at 70th Street, on the Upper West Side of Manhattan. The congregation has occupied its current Neoclassical building since 1897.

Founding and synagogue buildings 

The first group of Spanish and Portuguese Jews were twenty-three refugees from Dutch Brazil, who arrived in New Amsterdam in September 1654. After being initially rebuffed by anti-Semitic Director of New Netherland Peter Stuyvesant, Jews were given official permission to settle in the colony in 1655. This year marks the founding of the Congregation Shearith Israel. Although they were allowed to stay in New Amsterdam, they faced discrimination and were not given permission to worship in a public synagogue for some time (throughout the Dutch period and into the British). The Congregation did, however, make arrangements for a cemetery beginning in 1656.

It was not until 1730 that the Congregation was able to build a synagogue of its own; it was built on Mill Street (now William Street) in lower Manhattan. The Mill Street synagogue was said to have had access to a nearby spring which it used as a mikveh for ritual baths. Before 1730, as noted on a 1695 map of New York, the congregation worshipped in rented quarters on Beaver Street and subsequently on Mill Street. Since 1730 the Congregation has worshipped in five synagogue buildings:
 Mill Street, 1730
 Mill Street re-built and expanded, 1818
 60 Crosby Street, 1834
 19th Street, 1860
 West 70th Street, 1897 (present building)
The current building was extensively refurbished in 1921.

Founding major Jewish institutions
As the American Reform Judaism made headway in the late 19th century, many rabbis critical of the Reform movement looked for ways to strengthen traditional synagogues. Shearith Israel, and its rabbi, Henry Pereira Mendes, were at the fore of these efforts. Rabbi Mendes cofounded the American Jewish Theological Seminary (JTS) in 1886, in order to train traditional rabbis. The school held its first classes at Shearith Israel. In JTS' earliest days, it taught and researched rabbinics similarly as was done in traditional yeshivas, in contrast to the Reform Hebrew Union College.

Twelve years later, in 1896, Mendes was acting president of JTS. He promoted the formation of the Union of Orthodox Jewish Congregations of America (commonly known as the OU, the Orthodox Union). This synagogue umbrella group provided an alternative to the Reform movement's Union of American Hebrew Congregations.

As JTS grew, it needed better financing and a full-time head. The seminary moved to its own building, and Mendes was replaced by Solomon Schechter. However, Schechter developed a less traditional approach, which became the basis for Conservative Judaism (called Masorti outside North America). Initially there was considerable cooperation between the Orthodox and Conservative groups but, over time, the divide became clearer.

Schechter formed the United Synagogue of America (now the United Synagogue of Conservative Judaism, or USCJ) to promote synagogue affiliation with his conservative ideology.

Shearith Israel remained aligned with the Orthodox tradition. It eventually repudiated its association with JTS. In a sense, Shearith Israel helped create three of the largest and most significant Jewish religious organizations in the United States: JTS, the OU, and USCJ. Shearith Israel remains a member only of the Orthodox Union.

Clergy

Rabbis
Benjamin Wolf 
Gershom Mendes Seixas (not ordained): Hazzan of the Congregation and an ardent American patriot; he moved the Congregation to Philadelphia after the British occupied the city during the American Revolutionary War.
Moses L. M. Peixotto (not ordained)
Isaac B. Seixas (1828-1839)
Jacques Judah Lyons (1839-1877)
Henry Pereira Mendes (1877-1920)
David de Sola Pool - two stints (1907-1919 and 1921-1955). He was hired as assistant rabbi in 1907, and left in 1919. A year later, Mendes retired, and the synagogue went through a succession of candidates until de Sola Pool agreed to return in 1921. Herbert Goldstein was announced as rabbi, but did not actually take the pulpit. Reverend Joseph Corcos was appointed interim rabbi. 
Louis B. Gerstein (1956-1988)
Marc D. Angel (1969-2007)
Hayyim Angel (1995-2013)
Meir Y. Soloveichik (2013-)

Parnasim (Presidents)
Luis Moises Gomez
 Moses Raphael Levi (1665–1728)
 Lyon (Leon) Nathan
 Dennis Freilich

Alvin Deutsch (1997-2001)

Hazanim
Saul Moreno d. 1682
Saul Pardo (1657–1702)
Abraham Haim de Lucena (1703?–1725)
Moses Lopez de Fonseca (??–1736)
David Mendes Machado (1736–1746)
Benjamin Pereira (1748–1757)
Isaac Cohen da Silva (1757–1758 and 1766–1768)
Joseph Jessurun Pinto (1758–1766)
Gershom Mendes Seixas (1768–1776 and 1784–1816)
Isaac Touro (1780)
Jacob Raphael Cohen (1782–1784)
Eleazar S. Lazarus (1816-1820)
Moses Levy Maduro Peixotto(1816–1828)
Isaac Benjamin Seixas (1828–1839)
Jacques Judah Lyons (1839–1877)
David Haim Nieto (1878–1886)
Abraham Haim Nieto (1886–1901)
Isaac A. H. de la Penha (1902–1907)
Isaac A. Hadad (1911–1913)
Joseph M. Corcos (1919–1922)
James Mesod Wahnon (1921–1941)
Abraham Lopes Cardozo (1946–1986)
Albert Gabbai (1983-1986) 
Phil Sherman
Ira Rohde

Prominent members 
 
Jacob Baiz – merchant and Central American diplomat
Mark Blumenthal – physician, served as trustee of Shearith Israel
Albert Cardozo – Justice of the New York Supreme Court
Benjamin N. Cardozo – Justice of the Supreme Court of the United States, 1932–1937
Philip J. Joachimsen – lawyer and Judge of the New York Marine Court
Judith Kaye – Chief Judge of New York, 1993–2008
Emma Lazarus – poet
Commodore Uriah P. Levy – the first Jewish Commodore of the United States Navy
Theodore W. Myers – New York City Comptroller
Edgar J. Nathan – Manhattan Borough President and justice of the New York Supreme Court
Selig Newman – Polish-born Hebraist and educator 
Mordecai Manuel Noah – American playwright, sheriff, diplomat, and journalist
Isaac Pinto – prepared the first Jewish prayer book published in America, which was also the first English translation of the Siddur
Jack Rudin – real estate developer 
Arthur Tracy – singer and actor

See also

First Shearith Israel Graveyard
Jewish history in Colonial America
Touro Synagogue (Newport, Rhode Island), the oldest synagogue building in the U.S., was long thought to be owned by Congregation Shearith Israel. The claim was rejected by a federal district court in a 2016 legal suit. The First Circuit Court of Appeals in Boston, in a decision written by retired Supreme Court Justice David Souter, overturned this ruling in 2017. Jehudat Israel petitioned for certiorari in the U.S. Supreme Court. On March 2, 2019, the Supreme court denied certiorari, effectively allowing the decision in favor of Congregation Shearith Israel to stand.
Oldest synagogues in the United States

References
Notes

Bibliography
 Brockmann, Jorg and Bill Harris. (2002).  One Thousand New York Buildings. New York: Black Dog & Leventhal. ;  OCLC 48619292

External links

Official Site

1654 establishments in the Dutch Empire
Buildings and structures associated with the Dutch West India Company
Central Park West Historic District
Neoclassical synagogues
New Netherland
Orthodox synagogues in New York City
Portuguese-American culture in New York City
Portuguese-Jewish culture in the United States
Religion in the Dutch Empire
Synagogues completed in 1897
Religious organizations established in the 1650s
Spanish and Portuguese Jews
Sephardi Jewish culture in New York City
Sephardi synagogues
Spanish-American culture in New York City
Spanish-Jewish culture in the United States
Synagogues in Manhattan
Upper West Side
New York City Designated Landmarks in Manhattan
Historic district contributing properties in Manhattan